Mike Phiromphon (also spelled Phiromphorn or Piromporn) (b. July 8, 1966 — ) is a famous Mor lam and Luk thung singer from the Isan region of Thailand. He has many popular songs including "Lakorn Chee Wit", "Phoo Yu Bueang Lang", "Nuei Mai Kon Dee", "Ya Jai Khon Jon", "Klab Kham Sa Lar", "Kae Kaek Rab Chern", "Tee Pueng Khon Klai", "Yang Rak Kan Yoou Rue Plao", "Pha Lar Boon" etc.

Early life and career
His birth name is Phornphirom Pinthapakang and he was born on 8 July 1966 in Udon Thani Province. He is the son of Som and Sonklin. He finished education in secondary class. He started on stage in 1995 by releasing his first album Kan Lang Kor Lao, and  has worked in entertainment to date.

In 2001, he played his first television role in the series Nai Hoy Tamin in role Seeho,  associated with Jintara Poonlarp.

He is married and has two daughters.

Discography

Studio albums

Filmography

TV-Drama

References

External links
 

1966 births
Living people
Mike Phiromphon
Mike Phiromphon
Mike Phiromphon
Lao-language singers
Mike Phiromphon
Mike Phiromphon
Mike Phiromphon